Amazon Dash was a consumer goods ordering service which uses proprietary devices and APIs for ordering goods over the Internet.

Amazon Dash consisted of multiple components, which include:

 the Amazon Dash Wand, a Wi-Fi connected barcode scanner and voice command device, used to reorder consumer goods around the house, integrating with AmazonFresh;
 the Amazon Dash Button, a small consumer electronic device that can be placed around the house and programmed to order a consumer good such as disinfectant wipes or paper towels; and
 the Amazon Dash Replenishment Service, which allows manufacturers to add a physical button or auto-detection capability to their devices to reorder supplies from Amazon when necessary.
 Amazon Virtual Dash Buttons, which mimic the appearance and function of physical Dash Buttons, but are displayed on Amazon's website and some smart devices with displays.

Barcode scanner 
The Amazon Dash Wand (originally branded simply Amazon Dash) was announced in April 2014. It is a Wi-Fi connected device that allows users to build a shopping list by scanning bar codes and saying product names out loud. It connects directly with AmazonFresh, the company's online grocery delivery service. The website for Amazon Dash highlights benefits such as "never forget an item again" and suggests users keep the device on the kitchen counter or refrigerator so that every member of the family can add items to its grocery list.

The Amazon Dash Wand is Amazon's first Internet of Things (IoT) device.

The second-generation Amazon Dash Barcode Scanner was announced in October 2016; it replaces the two buttons on the previous model with a single button used for both scanning barcodes and activating the microphone. The new model is also about an inch shorter and magnetic so it can be stuck to a metallic surface, like a refrigerator.

On June 15, 2017, a new version of the scanner was announced by Amazon. The new version has Alexa built in, allowing users to ask for recipes and order from Amazon Prime Now.

Replenishment service 
The Dash Button and Dash Replenishment Service (DRS) were introduced by Amazon.com on March 31, 2015. Due to the timing of the announcement, there were a number of news stories questioning whether the Dash Button was an early April Fools joke.

The Amazon Dash Button is a small electronic device designed to make ordering products easy and fast. The Dash buttons come in packs; each device contains an embedded button emblazoned with the name of a frequently ordered product. Users can configure each button to order a specific product and quantity, via the user's Amazon.com account, and mount the buttons, using adhesive tape or a plastic clip, to locations where they use the products. Pressing the button sends a Wi-Fi signal to the Amazon Shopping app, and orders new stock of whatever product the button is configured to order; the click also sends a message to the user's mobile phone, giving the user half-hour to cancel.

Roll-out and response
Initially, the Dash buttons were made available by invitation to Amazon Prime members who were invited to request the devices. The devices received mixed reviews from critics and reporters upon release, and have been parodied online. In Germany, the product was deemed illegal due to insufficient information about the price of the product being given at the time of purchase. This was allegedly part of a larger dispute between Amazon and Germany, where Amazon battles with unions and is under investigation for attempting to monopolize the country.

Amazon Dash Buttons initially partnered with more than 100 brands. The most popular Dash Buttons were the Tide, Bounty, and Cottonelle buttons.

Alternative use

In August 2015, within a week of the first shipment of Dash buttons to Amazon Prime members, Popular Mechanics reported that it had already been reprogrammed for use as a push-button data tracker. Computer scientist Edward Benson published instructions online to turn it into a wireless spreadsheet entry device, or a trigger for any other API endpoint. The approach was based on hijacking and re-routing the button's network connection with Amazon's servers.

By May 2016, Consumers' Research pointed out that Amazon Dash was being reprogrammed to use for other purposes such as ordering pizza, tracking time, and controlling lights and outlets in households configured to respond to such commands. In response, Amazon introduced a programmer-friendly, but more expensive button in the form of an "Internet of Things Dash Button" which allows programmers to make programming modifications to the device.

End of service 
On March 1, 2019, Amazon discontinued the series, claiming that it was made unnecessary due to automatic reordering and product subscriptions. Additionally, Amazon claimed that voice-activated shopping on Alexa products would succeed the buttons. On June 22, 2020, Amazon sent an email to owners of the Dash Wand stating that they would be disconnected in a month on July 21, 2020 with no recourse other than to use other Amazon devices, and directed owners to simply recycle their devices.

References

External links 
 Amazon Dash official site

Dash
Internet of things